China Railway Guangzhou Group, officially abbreviated as CR Guangzhou or CR-Guangzhou, formerly, Guangzhou Railway (Group) Corporation from 1993 to 2017 and Guangzhou Railway Administration from 1953 to 1993, is a subsidiaries company under the jurisdiction of the China Railway (formerly the Ministry of Railway). It supervises the railway network within Guangdong, Hunan, and Hainan Provinces.

Guangzhou Railway is the largest shareholder (37.12%) of Guangshen Railway, the operator of Guangzhou–Shenzhen Railway.

Guangzhou Railway is a subsidiary of China Railway. Both companies were incorporated under the Law on Industrial Enterprises Owned by the Whole People, instead of newer Company Law of China.

China Railway is a state-owned enterprise (replacing the Ministry of Railways) that the Ministry of Finance acted as the shareholder.

The Chinese character  means iron, but  means railway, thus the company did not have any relation with Guangzhou Iron and Steel.

Equity investments

 Guangdong Pearl River Delta Intercity Railway (34.62%)

Hub stations
 Guangzhou
 Shenzhen
 Foshan
 
 Changsha
 , 
 Zhuzhou
 , 
 Hengyang
 
 Huaihua

Regional services

S-train services

C-train services
  Pearl River Delta Metropolitan Region intercity railway
 
 
 
 
 
 
 
 Hunan Province

References

External links
 

China Railway Corporation
Government-owned companies of China
Railway companies established in 1993
Chinese companies established in 1993
Railway companies of China